Gosford is a city in New South Wales, Australia.

Gosford may also refer to:

Toponyms 
City of Gosford, a local government area of the Australian state of New South Wales
Gosford railway station, in New South Wales
Gosford River, a river of Portneuf, Quebec, Canada
Gosford, Oxfordshire, a hamlet in Oxfordshire, England, UK
Gosford and Water Eaton, a civil parish in Oxfordshire
Gosford, Devon, a United Kingdom location
Gosford, Herefordshire, a place in Herefordshire

See also
Gosford Castle, County Armagh, Northern Ireland
Gosford House, East Lothian, Scotland
Earl of Gosford, a title in the Peerage of Ireland
Gosford Park, a 2001 mystery comedy-drama film directed by Robert Altman 
Gosforth,  an area of Newcastle upon Tyne, Tyne and Wear, England, United Kingdom
Gosford Glyphs, a rock site with pseudo-Egyptian hieroglyphs in Central Coast, NSW, Australia